Wire & Glass (subtitled "Six songs from a mini-opera") is the only EP released from The Who's 2006 album, Endless Wire. The EP was released exclusively to the iTunes Music Store on 17 July 2006 but a Maxi-CD/12" was released a week later in Australia and the United Kingdom. The EP was released as a "mini-opera" in six songs. No North American distribution was secured prior to the release of Endless Wire, but promo copies were pressed in France, Germany, Ireland, and Ukraine.

The EP reached the top three on the Canadian Singles Chart. The songs from this album were used in the rock musical adaptation of The Boy Who Heard Music which debuted in July 2007 as part of Vassar College's Powerhouse Summer Theater workshop series.

Track listing
All songs written by Pete Townshend

Upon release as a CD/12", all six songs were presented as a single track.

The songs
"Sound Round" was reportedly written for the 1971 album Who's Next but not recorded. "Mirror Door" was released ahead of the rock opera for radio play in June 2006, but initial reaction was lukewarm due to a questionable mix. Between dates on the 2006 UK and European tour, Townshend remixed the track, adding echo to Daltrey's vocals and giving it a punchier sound.

Personnel
The Who
Roger Daltrey – vocals
Pete Townshend – guitars, vocals, mandolin, ukulele, banjo

Additional musicians
John "Rabbit" Bundrick – keyboards, organ
Peter Huntington – drums
Billy Nicholls – backing vocals
Pino Palladino – bass guitar
Simon Townshend – backing vocals

Production
Myles Clarke – engineering
Bob Pridden – engineering

Design
Richard Evans – Design & Art Direction
Ross Halfin- Cover photograph

Charts

References

Songs written by Pete Townshend
Albums produced by Pete Townshend
2006 EPs
The Who EPs
Polydor Records EPs